Christian Möckel (born 6 April 1973 in Karl-Marx-Stadt (now Chemnitz), East Germany) is a retired German football player. As of September 2012, he is the head scout for 1. FC Nürnberg. As a player, he spent one season in the Bundesliga with 1. FC Nürnberg.

References

1973 births
Living people
German footballers
1. FC Nürnberg players
SpVgg Greuther Fürth players
TSG 1899 Hoffenheim players
VfB Lübeck players
Sportspeople from Chemnitz
Bundesliga players
2. Bundesliga players
Association football midfielders
VfB Fortuna Chemnitz players
Footballers from Saxony